Angeta Rud may refer to:
 Angeta Rud-e Pain